The 1971–72 season was Stoke City's 65th season in the Football League and the 41st in the First Division.

After 109 years of trying Stoke City finally won their first major trophy in March 1972 beating Chelsea 2–1 in the League Cup final at Wembley. They also reached the semi final of the FA Cup for the second season running and again lost out to Arsenal. Their league campaign obviously took a hit with all the cup matches being played, Stoke finished in 17th position with 35 points. In total Stoke played 71 matches during a very busy season.

Season review

League
The Stoke fans were confident of seeing more good exciting attacking football again as the 1971–72 season commenced but overall league performances were bitterly disappointing, however in the cup competitions Stoke did themselves proud. With the cup matches obviously taking priority Stoke had a back-log of fixtures to play (six games in 17 days) and they failed to win any of them as they finished in 17th position with 35 points.

FA Cup
Stoke had another run to the semi-final of the FA Cup after beating lower league sides, Chesterfield, Tranmere Rovers, Hull City and another two matches against Manchester United, Stoke faced Arsenal again. Villa Park hosted the tie and thanks to an own goal from Peter Simpson, Stoke scraped a 1–1 draw in a close match. The replay at Goodison Park was controversial. Stoke took an early lead through a penalty, but the "Gunners" won a controversial penalty of their own for a handball after a corner that was given despite Gordon Banks appearing to have been fouled beforehand. Arsenal converted the penalty. The "Gunners" then started controlling the match and scored a second goal, which nevertheless looked suspiciously offside, and that was how the match ended, as Stoke went down 2–1 and their hopes of achieving a Wembley double disappeared.

League Cup
In the League Cup Stoke ousted Southport and Oxford United and then in the fourth round Stoke visited Old Trafford and held Manchester United to a 1–1 draw with John Ritchie cancelling out a goal from Alan Gowling.  The replay attracted almost 41,000 fans to the Victoria Ground but this time there was no goals and third game was required. This was again staged at Stoke and two late goals sealed a 2–1 victory and passage to the last eight. At this stage of the season matches were coming thick and fast and a 4–2 win over Bristol Rovers saw Stoke enter the semi finals of the League Cup where they met West Ham United over two legs.

Not only was this to be a memorable cup tie for Stoke, the encounter has also been described as "epic". In the 1st leg Stoke's hopes of reaching the final seemed to have disappeared when they lost 2–1 to home. However at West Ham, Ritchie levelled the aggregated score with 20 minutes left, and with just three of those remaining West Ham were awarded a penalty, a decision which angered Gordon Banks immensely. The England 'keeper was so psyched up that he dived and saved Geoff Hurst's spot kick superbly, Banks says that it was his most significant save of his career. And so to a third match, a replay at Hillsborough, was a tense 0–0 draw. The fourth meeting was staged at Old Trafford and another bumper crowd turned out to see the two sides do battle in a match that seemed to have everything. Bobby Ferguson, the "Hammers" goalkeeper was accidentally kicked on the head by Terry Conroy and Bobby Moore went in goal. He saved a Mike Bernard penalty but was beaten on the rebound. Ferguson returned and the game ebbed and flowed, and either side could have won. In the end it was Stoke with Conroy scoring the winning goal to send City through to their first major final.

The final took place on 4 March 1972 at Wembley against Chelsea in front of a crowd 97,852. Stoke showed no big match nerves and took an early lead through Terry Conroy, this prompted a response by Chelsea and just before the interval a rare mistake from Alan Bloor allowed Peter Osgood to level the scores. Stoke were not to be denied and on 73 minutes the veteran George Eastham scored the winning goal to earn Stoke their first major trophy.

Final league table

Results

Stoke's score comes first

Legend

Football League First Division

FA Cup

League Cup

Texaco Cup

Anglo-Italian Cup

Friendlies

Squad statistics

References

Stoke City F.C. seasons
Stoke